The 2010–11 Mauritanian Premier League was the 35th season of the Mauritanian Premier League, the top-level football championship of Mauritania. It began on 24 December 2010 and concluded on 18 June 2011 . CF Cansado are the defending champions.

Teams
In comparison to the 2010 season, league size was decreased from twelve to nine teams due to unknown reasons.

Dar El Naim and Dar El Barka were relegated to the second-level league after finishing the 2010 season at the bottom of the table. They were replaced by second-level champions ASC Police and ASC Imraguens.

List of participating teams
 ASAC Concorde (Nouakchott)
 ASC El Ahmedi (Nouakchott)
 ASC Imraguens
 ASC Kédia (Zouérate)
 ACS Ksar (Nouakchott)
 ASC Police
 ASC Tevragh-Zeïna
 CF Cansado (Nouadhibou)
 FC Nouadhibou ASJN (Nouadhibou)

League table

References

External links
 RSSSF competition history
 Mauritanian Premier League @ FIFA website

Maur
2010 in Mauritanian sport
2011 in Mauritanian sport
2011